Scott Hauck is an electrical engineer from the University of Washington in Seattle. He was named a Fellow of the Institute of Electrical and Electronics Engineers (IEEE) in 2016 for his contributions to field-programmable gate array-based systems.

References 

Fellow Members of the IEEE
Living people
University of Washington faculty
21st-century American engineers
Year of birth missing (living people)
American electrical engineers